Cardmaker may refer to:

Cardmaking, the craft of hand-making cards
Richard Cardmaker (fl. 1376–1399), MP for Devizes
John Cardmaker (1496–1555), English Protestant martyr.